WKZU Kudzu 104.9 FM, formally WKZU Kudzu 102.3 FM, is a 50,000 watt FM radio station licensed to Iuka, Mississippi operating as Kudzu 104.9 Classic Country.  The station has a Classic Country music format, with music from the 1960s, 1970s, 1980s, and 1990s.  The station's target audience is 32- to 54-year-old adults who started listening to country music in the 1970s and 1980s.

References

External links
 WKZU Webpage
 Map showing the broadcast area of WKZU
 

KZU
Country radio stations in the United States